The 2018 Donegal Senior Football Championship was the 96th official edition of Donegal GAA's premier Gaelic football tournament for senior graded clubs in County Donegal. Sixteen teams compete with the winner representing Donegal in the Ulster Senior Club Football Championship. The championship begins with four groups of four and continues with a knock-out format. The draws were made on 24 March 2018.

Kilcar were the defending champions after they defeated Naomh Conaill of Glenties 0-7 to 0-4 in the 2017 final. However, the club had to play the competition without two of its county stars, Patrick McBrearty and Ryan McHugh. On 26 September 2018, it was announced that McHugh had accepted medical advice and would be sidelined for the remainder of the year due to concussion. His injury came while playing for his club in a challenge match against Dublin champions St Vincents in Cavan in late August 2018 — he received a blow to the head during that match. Concussion had also caused McHugh to spend six weeks on the sideline following a 2018 National Football League game (against Kildare or Tyrone depending on which report you read) earlier that year. The injury meant he could take no part in the 2018 Donegal Senior Football Championship (of which his club were the defending champions), news which was worsened when taken in the context of the earlier loss of McHugh's club and county teammate McBrearty to a cruciate ligament injury.

This was Milford's return to the senior grade after relegation in the mid-1990s after claiming the 2017 Donegal I.F.C. title.

On 21 October 2018, Gaoth Dobhair claimed their 15th S.F.C. title when defeating Naomh Conaill of Glenties by 0-17 to 1-7 at MacCumhaill Park.

Burt were relegated back to the 2019 I.F.C. after just two seasons in the top-flight when losing their Relegation Final to newly promoted Milford.

Team changes

The following teams changed division since the 2017 championship season.

To S.F.C.
Promoted from 2017 Donegal I.F.C.
 Milford -  (I.F.C. Champions)

From S.F.C.
Relegated to 2018 Donegal I.F.C.
 Naomh Muire

Format
The 2018 County Championship took the same format as previous championships in which there was four groups of four with the top two qualifying for the quarter-finals. Bottom of each group play in relegation play-offs to decide which team is relegated the 2019 Intermediate championship.

Group stage
All 16 teams entered the competition at this stage. The top 2 teams in each group advanced to the quarter-finals while the bottom team of each group entered a Relegation Playoff. This year, all teams played one home match, one away match and one match at a neutral venue.

Group A

Round 1

Round 2

Round 3

Group B

Round 1

Round 2

Round 3

Group C

Round 1

Round 2

Round 3

Group D

Round 1

Round 2

Round 3

Knock-Out Stage

Quarter-finals

Semi-finals

Final

Relegation Playoffs

Relegation Semi-Finals

Relegation Final

Ulster Senior Club Football Championship

References

Donegal Senior Football Championship
Donegal SFC
Donegal Senior Football Championship